Antony Curic (born January 16, 2001) is a Canadian soccer player who plays for Toronto FC II in MLS Next Pro.

Early career
Curic spent four years playing youth soccer with the Erin Mills Soccer Club where he won two Ontario Cup championships, the first in 2016 in which he scored twice in a 5-0 win in the finals. In May 2019, while with Erin Mills, he was invited to an international identification camp hosted by ANB Futbol, where he impressed scouts and was invited to a one-week camp hosted by French Ligue 2 club FC Lorient to train with their academy. He spent some time with the Toronto FC Academy.

In 2019, he began attending Ryerson University joining the Rams soccer team, playing one year with the team.

Curic is of Croatian descent.

Career
In December 2020, he signed his first professional contract, for two seasons, with Toronto FC II of USL League One to join the team for the 2021 season. He made his debut for Toronto FC II on May 22, 2021 against North Texas SC.

Career statistics

Club

References

2001 births
Living people
Association football defenders
Canadian soccer players
Soccer players from Toronto
Toronto FC II players
MLS Next Pro players
USL League One players